Christopher Maher (born as Maher Boutros; born 1955) is an American film and television actor, as well as a chef.

Background
Born in Alexandria, Egypt, Maher's family moved to Toronto in the 1960s.  He started pre-med studies but changed to acting at the University of Toronto.  Arriving in New York in 1978, he studied acting further at the Neighborhood Playhouse School of the Theatre.

Maher worked at Tavern on the Green, where he met Drew Nieporent.

He broke into Entertainment with a year-long role as assassin Colonel Hashim on Another World.

Career

Acting
In 1982, Maher moved to Los Angeles to pursue motion-picture roles. He changed his name from Maher Boutros to Christopher Maher.  "I was typecast as a dumb Arab or a bad Arab, one or the other. It depressed me, and I just refused to do any more."

He has appeared in feature films and television episodes from Taxi and Hill Street Blues to Law and Order, 24, The West Wing and NCIS. He was in the film Olive, in which he starred with Gena Rowlands.

Cooking
Maher was also recognized by the James Beard Foundation as one of the great regional chefs of America and has cooked at the Beard House in New York City.

He runs a cooking school called "Cooking Studio Taos" plus natural and organic food venture in Taos.  The food products are sold under the name "Caleb&Milo", named after their two sons. They sell their products in whole food markets and other gourmet markets.

Personal
Maher lives in Taos, New Mexico, where he runs a cooking school called "Cooking Studio Taos" with wife Valerie

Filmography

References

External links 
 
 Cooking Studio Taos:  bio

American male film actors
American male television actors
American chefs
American male chefs
1955 births
Living people
People from Alexandria
Egyptian emigrants to the United States